Synlestes tropicus is a species of Australian damselfly in the family Synlestidae,
commonly known as a tropical needle. 
It is endemic to north-eastern Queensland, where it inhabits streams in rainforests.

Synlestes tropicus is a large to very large damselfly, coloured a metallic green-black with pale markings. It perches with its wings partially or fully outspread.

Gallery

See also
 List of Odonata species of Australia

References 

Synlestidae
Odonata of Australia
Insects of Australia
Endemic fauna of Australia
Taxa named by Robert John Tillyard
Insects described in 1917
Damselflies